Chase Daniel DeLauter (born October 8, 2001) is an American professional baseball outfielder in the Cleveland Guardians organization.

Amateur career
DeLauter attended Hedgesville High School in Hedgesville, West Virginia, where he played football, basketball, and baseball. In 2018, as a junior, he batted .500 and also pitched to a 1.95 ERA with 64 strikeouts. As a senior in 2019, he went 9-2 with a 0.84 ERA over 66 innings alongside hitting .606 with eight home runs, 52 RBIs, and 21 doubles. He was named the Gatorade Player of the Year for the state of West Virginia.

After graduating high school, DeLauter enrolled at James Madison University to play college baseball. As a freshman in 2020, DeLauter earned a starting spot and batted .382 with 26 hits and 14 RBIs over 16 games before the season was cancelled due to the COVID-19 pandemic. He earned Freshman All-American honors from Collegiate Baseball Newspaper. He played in the Rockingham County Baseball League for the Broadway Bruins that summer where he batted .527 with 18 home runs and 45 RBIs over thirty games. In 2021, as a redshirt freshman, he slashed .386/.500/.723 with six home runs, 21 RBIs, and a 1.231 OPS over 26 games. He missed two games during the season due to injury. Following the season's end, he played collegiate summer baseball for the Orleans Firebirds of the Cape Cod Baseball League where he was named a league all-star and earned the Robert A. McNeese Outstanding Pro Prospect Award after batting .298 with nine home runs over 34 games. DeLauter entered the 2022 season as a top prospect for the upcoming draft. In early April, he broke his foot and missed the remainder of the season. Over 24 games before the injury, he batted .437 with eight home runs and 35 RBIs. Following the season's end, he traveled to San Diego where he participated in the Draft Combine.

Professional career
The Cleveland Guardians selected DeLauter in the first round with the 16th overall selection of the 2022 Major League Baseball draft. He signed with the team for $3.75 million. He did not play for the organization in 2022 due to a broken foot he suffered in the spring.

On January 10, 2023, DeLauter underwent surgery to address a fracture in the fifth toe of his left foot, sidelining him for 4-5 months.

References

External links
JMU Dukes bio

2001 births
Living people
Baseball players from West Virginia
Baseball outfielders
James Madison Dukes baseball players
Orleans Firebirds players